Bill Schwartz may refer to:

 Bill Schwartz (catcher) (1864–1940), 19th century baseball catcher
 Bill Schwartz (first baseman) (1884–1961), 20th century baseball first baseman